Siddheshwar Shastri Chitrāv (1 February 1894 - 7 January 1984) was an Indian Vedic scholar, lexicographer, translator and writer of Marathi literature. Chitrav was credited with the translations of many upanishads into Marathi language. He also wrote many dictionaries such as Mahabhashayshabadkosh, Prachin Bharatiya Sthalakosha and Shri Ganesh Kosha. He was honoured by the Government of India in 1970 with Padma Shri, the fourth highest Indian civilian award.

See also

 Upanishad
 Vedas

References

External links
 

Recipients of the Padma Shri in literature & education
1894 births
Indian male writers
20th-century Indian translators
Indian lexicographers
Indian Vedic scholars
Marathi-language writers
Year of death missing
20th-century Indian non-fiction writers